Taichung HSR is a railway and metro station in Wuri District, Taichung, Taiwan. It is served by Taiwan High Speed Rail and the Green Line of the Taichung Metro. The station is adjacent to Xinwuri Station of Taiwan Railway Administration.

History
The station is elevated and has two island platforms. Since all services stop at this station, the passing tracks located between platforms are rarely used to connect trains with the depot to the south.

The design of the station was carried out by HOY Architects, a Taipei based firm. Construction took four years and took $5 billion NTD, making it the most expensive station at the time of its opening.

Prior to the opening of Miaoli, Changhua and Yunlin HSR stations in December 2015, this was the only operational high speed rail station in Central Taiwan.

Utilization status 
Due to the location of Taichung HSR station, not only can the station service residents of Taichung, but it can also service those living in the northern part of Changhua County in central Changhua. In addition, the development of Taichung has become increasingly prosperous in recent years. Since 2011, the number of passengers enter/exiting from Taichung HSR station has surpassed the number of passengers enter/exiting from Zuoying HSR station, and its growth continues to accelerate.

Platform layout

Station layout

Metro service
A metro service operated by Taichung Metro is available through an out-of-station transfer.

The HSR concourse could be reached via a bridge through Xinwuri railway station.

HSR services
HSR services 1xx, (1)2xx, (1)3xx, (1)5xx, (1)6xx, and (8)8xx call at this station, making this the HSR station with the most services and the only HSR station with all services.

Around the station
 TRA Xinwuri Station
 Dadu River
 Greater Taichung International Expo Center
 National Freeway 1
 National Freeway 3
 Provincial Highway 74

Gallery

References

Railway stations served by Taiwan High Speed Rail
Railway stations in Taichung
Railway stations opened in 2006
Taichung Metro